Noel Helmore Hobson (born 15 July 1934) is a former New Zealand field hockey player. He represented New Zealand in field hockey between 1955 and 1963, including at the 1956 Olympic Games in Melbourne and the 1960 Olympic Games in Rome.

His son, Scott Hobson, represented New Zealand in field hockey at the 1992 Olympic Games.

References

External links

1934 births
Living people
Field hockey players from Christchurch
New Zealand male field hockey players
Olympic field hockey players of New Zealand
Field hockey players at the 1956 Summer Olympics
Field hockey players at the 1960 Summer Olympics
20th-century New Zealand people
21st-century New Zealand people